The 1957–58 Scottish League Cup was the 12th season of Scotland's second football knockout competition. The competition was won Celtic, who defeated Rangers in the Final.

First round

Group 1

Group 2

Group 3

Group 4

Group 5

Group 6

Group 7

Group 8

Group 9

Supplementary Round

First Leg

Second Leg

Quarter-finals

First Leg

Second Leg

Semi-finals

Final

References

General

Specific 

1957–58 in Scottish football
Scottish League Cup seasons